Victor LaValle's Destroyer or simply Destroyer is a six-issue comic book limited series written by Victor LaValle with art from illustrator Dietrich Smith and colorist Joana Lafuente.  The series was published by Boom! Studios from May–October 2017, and it was later collected as a trade paperback in March 2018.  It is a modern sequel to Mary Shelley's Frankenstein that tells the legacy of Dr. Frankenstein, looking at both his own descendants and Frankenstein's monster.  Destroyer was well-received and won the 2018 Bram Stoker Award for Best Graphic Novel.

Plot

Reception 
The comic series was well received by critics scoring an average rating of 8.3 for the entire series based on 35 critic reviews aggregated by Comic Book Roundup.  Writing for Tor.com, Alex Brown felt that its commentary on race relations was its strongest element, although the additional topics touched on felt unfocused.  Brown also praised the creativity of the art making up the book finding that the art, colors, and lettering all provided their own key contributions to the overall story.

Accolades 
Destroyer was awarded the 2018 Bram Stoker Award for Best Graphic Novel in May 2019.

References 

Boom! Studios limited series